Little River Township is an inactive township in Pemiscot County, in the U.S. state of Missouri.

Little River Township takes its name from the Little River.

References

Townships in Missouri
Townships in Pemiscot County, Missouri